Siegmund Weltlinger (born March 29, 1886 in Hamburg, died 18 May 1974 in Berlin) was a founding member and first Jewish president of the Society for Christian-Jewish Cooperation in Berlin from 1949 to 1970. He has been honorary president since 1970. Weltlinger was also a CDU member.

Early life
Weltlinger was born in 1886 in Hamburg and grew up in Kassel, where he performed his military service after high school and then completed a banking apprenticeship. During the First World War, he served as a front-line soldier in 1915. Later, he was transferred as a financial expert in the central buying group of Belgian civilian administration. In November 1918, he went back to Berlin, where he was married a year later.

Between the wars
He joined the bank, Julius I. Mayer, as a profit-participating attorney. In 1925 he left the bank and started his own business as a stockbroker, which he practiced until Kristallnacht in 1938.

World War II
After Kristallnacht in November 1938, Weltlinger was jailed for two months in the concentration camp of Sachsenhausen. From March 1939 to February 1942, he worked at the Jewish Community of Berlin and was responsible for the administration and collection of emigration and Theresienstadt home shopping duties.  Non-Jewish friends and family hid Weltinger and his wife, Margaret, until the end of the war in their Berlin half-room apartment.

After a first job as assistant to the Magistrates for Jewish Affairs in 1946, Weltlinger joined the CDU. In November 1949, he was among the founding members of the Society for Christian-Jewish Cooperation in Berlin and was chairman until 1970. From 1959 to 1967, he was a member of the Berlin House of Representatives and became senior member of the House. In 1961, he was awarded the title of a town elder. Weltlinger died in Berlin in 1974 and was buried in an honorary grave in the cemetery of the Jewish community in Berlin on the highway.

Towards the very end of his life, he was interviewed in the now famous documentary series, The World at War. He died a few months after the interview at the age of 88.

Honours

1966: Great Cross of Merit of the Federal Republic of Germany
1971: Ernst-Reuter-plaque
Honorary grave in the cemetery of the Jewish Community of Berlin, Heerstraße

References

 Ulrich Werner Grimm: "Die Berliner Gesellschaft für Christlich-Jüdische Zusammenarbeit. Geschichte(n) im Spiegel ihrer Quellen". In: Gesellschaft für Christlich-Jüdische Zusammenarbeit in Berlin e.V. (ed.): Im Gespräch. 50 Jahre Gesellschaft für Christlich-Jüdische Zusammenarbeit in Berlin e.V. – Eine Festschrift; Konzeption/Redaktion: Ulrich Werner Grimm, Berlin, 1999.
 Geschichtswerkstatt am Friedrichsgymnasium Kassel / Gerd Adamski (eds.):  "Ich habe es nie bereut, ein deutscher Jude zu sein!" Erinnerungen an Siegmund Weltlinger (1886–1974), Kassel, 1997
 Siegmund Weltlinger: Hast Du es schon vergessen? Erlebnisbericht aus der Zeit der Verfolgung, Berlin, 1954.
 Gesellschaft für christlich-jüdische Zusammenarbeit in Berlin e. V. (ed.): Jugenderinnerungen und Altersbekenntnisse eines deutschen Juden. Vortrag, gehalten durch Siegmund Weltlinger am 10. Januar 1968 im Amerika-Haus vor der Gesellschaft für christlich-jüdische Zusammenarbeit in Berlin e.V., Berlin., 1968

External links

“I’ve never regretted being a German Jew”: Siegmund Weltlinger and the Re-establishment of the Jewish Community in Berlin
 Thames Television interview from 1972

1886 births
1974 deaths
Politicians from Kassel
German Jewish military personnel of World War I
Commanders Crosses of the Order of Merit of the Federal Republic of Germany